Jacoby Lamar Shepherd (born August 31, 1979) is a former professional gridiron football cornerback. He was drafted in the second round of the 2000 NFL Draft by the St. Louis Rams. He played college football for the Oklahoma State Cowboys.

Shepherd has also been a member of the Houston Texans, Green Bay Packers, New York Jets, Detroit Lions, Oakland Raiders, Edmonton Eskimos, Calgary Stampeders, Dallas Desperados, Utah Blaze and Georgia Force.

Early years
Shepherd was born on August 31, 1979 in Lufkin, Texas. He played high school football at Lufkin High School in Texas, where he was a star football player, track athlete and basketball player. He played at both wide receiver and cornerback in high school.

College career

Tyler Junior College
In 1996, Shepherd recorded 40 tackles, one sack and four interceptions as a freshman at Tyler. After the season, he was named Co-Defensive player of the year. As a sophomore in 1997 he was named All-Southwest Junior College.

Oklahoma State
After 1997, Shepherd transferred to Oklahoma State University. During his junior year in 1998, he started two games and had 22 tackles, six pass deflections and two interceptions.

Professional career

Pre-draft

National Football League
Shepherd was drafted by the St. Louis Rams in the second round of the 2000 NFL Draft. As a rookie, he played in 15 games and recorded one interception. During the 2001 off season, he was hampered by a hamstring injury. On October 3, 2001, Shepherd was fined by the NFL, along with eight other Rams players for uniform violations. In a practice on October 25, Shepherd and teammate Yo Murphy got into a heated fight, which included punches being thrown and facemask grabbing. kicking the other players sook For the rest of the season, he suffered from a quadriceps injury. He recorded three tackles during the 2001 season. When the Houston Texans were to become the 32nd team in the NFL, each team was required to put five players onto an "expansion list", Shepherd was one of the five Rams on the list.

On March 28, 2002, the Houston Texans traded a conditional draft pick in the 2003 NFL Draft to the Rams in return for Shepherd. Shepherd was waived by the Texans on September 2, 2002. Shepherd signed with the Green Bay Packers on January 1, 2003. He was waived on August 26, 2003.

The New York Jets signed Shepherd on August 30, 2003. In four games with the Jets, Shepherd had two tackles. After being tried at dimeback, Shepherd was waived on October 1, 2003. Shepherd signed with the Detroit Lions on October 29, 2003. He was waived on November 25. With the Lions, Shepherd played in four games and had two tackles. On April 14, 2004, Shepherd signed with the Oakland Raiders. He was released on August 13.

Canadian Football League
Shepherd spent time with the Edmonton Eskimos during their 2005 training camp.

The Calgary Stampeders signed Shepherd on June 16, 2005. He was cut on June 18.

Arena Football League
After being released by Calgary, Shepherd joined the Dallas Desperados. In his first year with Dallas, he had 10.5 tackles, one interception and one forced fumble.

On May 3, 2007, at the Arena Football League's trade deadline, Shepherd was traded to the Utah Blaze. With the Blaze he recorded 44.5 tackles and two pass breakups.

Personal life
Shepherd resides in St George, Utah with his wife, LyKendra and his son Jordan, and works for Costco Wholesale as a forklift driver. His cousin is former Kansas City Chiefs kick returner Dante Hall.

References

1979 births
Living people
Players of American football from Texas
American football cornerbacks
Canadian football defensive backs
American players of Canadian football
Tyler Apaches football players
Oklahoma State Cowboys football players
St. Louis Rams players
Houston Texans players
New York Jets players
Detroit Lions players
Oakland Raiders players
Edmonton Elks players
Calgary Stampeders players
Dallas Desperados players
Utah Blaze players
Georgia Force players
People from Lufkin, Texas
Green Bay Packers players